Roy Curtis Baham (born March 2, 1963) is a former professional American football defensive back in the National Football League for the  Seattle Seahawks. He played college football at Tulane University.

Early years
Baham attended Covington High School, where he practiced football, baseball and track. He accepted a football scholarship from Tulane University.

Professional career
Baham was signed as an undrafted free agent by the Philadelphia Eagles after the 1987 NFL Draft. He was waived before the start of the season.

After the NFLPA strike was declared on the third week of the 1987 season, those contests were canceled (reducing the 16 game season to 15) and the NFL decided that the games would be played with replacement players. He was signed to be a part of the Seattle Seahawks replacement team. He played in 3 games and was released at the end of the strike in October.

In 1988, he was signed as a free agent by the Dallas Cowboys. He was released on August 8.

References

1963 births
Living people
People from Covington, Louisiana
Players of American football from Louisiana
American football cornerbacks
Tulane Green Wave football players
Seattle Seahawks players
National Football League replacement players